Arnemann is a surname. Notable people with the surname include:

Raul Arnemann (born 1953), Estonian rower
William Arnemann (1850–1917), German-born American businessman and politician